The 4 x 400 metre relay at the 2005 World Championships in Athletics was held at the Helsinki Olympic Stadium on August 13 and August 14.

Medals

Qualifying
From the initial two heats the first three teams in each plus two fastest losers progressed through to the final.

All times shown are in seconds.
Q denotes automatic qualification.
q denotes fastest losers.
DNS denotes did not start.
DNF denotes did not finish.
AR denotes area record.
NR denotes national record.
PB denotes personal best.
SB denotes season's best.

Heat 1
 Russia (Olesya Krasnomovets, Natalya Antyukh, Tatyana Firova, Olesya Zykina) 3:20.32 Q (WL)
 Poland (Anna Guzowska, Monika Bejnar, Grażyna Prokopek, Zuzanna Radecka) 3:26.04 Q
 Belarus (Natalya Sologub, Yulyana Zhalniaruk, Anna Kozak, Ilona Usovich) 3:27.65 Q (SB)
 Germany (Claudia Marx, Claudia Hoffman, Corinna Fink, Ulrike Urbansky) 3:27.96 q
 Senegal (Aïda Diop, Fatou Bintou Fall, Aminata Diouf, Amy Mbacké Thiam) 3:29.03 (SB)
 Romania (Angela Moroşanu, Mihaela Stancescu-Neacsu, Alina Râpanu, Maria Rus) 3:30.97
 Bulgaria (Monika Gachevska, Mariyana Dimitrova, Nedyalka Nedkova, Monika Ivanova) 3:38.96

Heat 2
 Great Britain (Lee McConnell, Donna Fraser, Nicola Sanders, Christine Ohuruogu) 3:26.19 Q (SB)
 Brazil (Maria Laura Almirão, Geisa Aparecida Coutinho, Josiane Tito, Lucimar Teodoro) 3:26.82 Q (AR)
 Ukraine (Antonina Yefremova, Oksana Ilyushkina, Liliya Pilyuhina, Natalya Pygyda) 3:27.23 Q
 Jamaica (Shericka Williams, Novlene Williams, Ronetta Smith, Lorraine Fenton) 3:27.87 q (SB)
 Mexico (Ruth Grajeda, Gabriela Medina, Mayra González, Magali Yañez) 3:31.41 (SB)
 South Africa (Amanda Kotze, Dominique Koster, Surita Febbraio, Estie Wittstock) 3:31.71 (SB)
 United States (Suziann Reid, Monique Hennagan, Moushaumi Robinson, Monique Henderson) DSQ

Final
 Russia (Yuliya Pechonkina, Olesya Krasnomovets, Natalya Antyukh, Svetlana Pospelova) 3:20.95
 Jamaica (Shericka Williams, Novlene Williams, Ronetta Smith, Lorraine Fenton) 3:23.29 (SB)
 Great Britain (Lee McConnell, Donna Fraser, Nicola Sanders, Christine Ohuruogu) 3:24.44 (SB)
 Poland (Anna Guzowska, Monika Bejnar, Grażyna Prokopek, Anna Jesień) 3:24.49 (NR)
 Ukraine (Antonina Yefremova, Oksana Ilyushkina, Liliya Pilyuhina, Natalya Pygyda) 3:28.00
 Germany (Claudia Marx, Claudia Hoffman, Corinna Fink, Ulrike Urbansky) 3:28.39
 Brazil (Maria Laura Almirão, Geisa Aparecida Coutinho, Josiane Tito, Lucimar Teodoro) DSQ
 Belarus (Alena Nevmerzhitskaya, Natalya Sologub, Anna Kozak, Ilona Usovich) DSQ

External links
IAAF results, heats
IAAF results, final

Relay
Relays at the World Athletics Championships
2005 in women's athletics